Horaiclavus phaeocercus is a species of sea snail, a marine gastropod mollusk in the family Horaiclavidae.

Description
The length of the shell attains 11 mm and is in a spiral shape which is a trait all members of its Genus share. The way to tell Horaiclavus Phaeocercus apart from other members of its genus is its distinct dark brown upper part of the shell. The shells apex however turns back to the light tan color of the rest of its shell and has a dull point.

Distribution
This marine species occurs off New Caledonia

References

 Fedosov, A.; Kantor, Y. (2008). Toxoglossan gastropods of the subfamily Crassispirinae (Turridae) lacking a radula, and a discussion of the status of the subfamily Zemaciinae. Journal of Molluscan Studies, 74(1), 27–35

External links

 

phaeocercus